Banti is an Italian surname. It may refer to:

Anna Banti (1895-1985), Italian writer
Brigida Banti (1757-1806), Italian soprano
Luisa Banti (1894-1978), Italian archaeologist
Luca Banti (born 1974), Italian football referee
Guido Banti (1852-1925), Italian physician
Cristiano Banti (1824-1904), Italian painter
Hervé Banti (born 1977), Monégasque-national Olympic triathlete

See also
 Séamus McEnaney (born 1967/1968), Irish Gaelic football manager known as "Banty"

Italian-language surnames